"Laredo" is the second single taken from Band of Horses' third album Infinite Arms, which was released on April 13, 2010. The song peaked #34 on the US Alternative Songs chart and #41 on the US Rock Songs chart, making it the band's third most successful single after "Casual Party" and "Is There a Ghost".

History
The song was initially rarely played in concert by the band, but has become a live standard since charting.

As with several songs from Infinite Arms, "Laredo" mentions a specific location. Bridwell explained, "Anywhere I live, the region has its effects in the writing process, or anywhere that I end up writing songs, I'm sure it seeps into the bones," although he admitted, "I'm not even sure if I know what it's about, but maybe...there was a bit of a homesickness." He was partly inspired to write "Laredo" during his time in an isolated cabin in the woods of Minnesota, he said, "There was no one around and I could just really immerse myself and whining as loud as possible."

In the music video for the song, the intro is approximately twice as long as the version on Infinite Arms.

Reception
The Daily World praised Bridwell's distinctive vocals and singled out "Laredo" as a stand out song on Infinite Arms. Spin magazine said, "With its midtempo stroll, crunchy Southern guitar, and Ben Bridwell's silky vocals, 'Laredo' sounds like a younger cousin of 'Weed Party' from the band's 2006 debut album, Everything All the Time."

Personnel
Benjamin Bridwell – vocals, guitars, drums, sounds, memotron
Creighton Barret – drums, thunderdrum, percussion
Ryan Monroe – keyboards, vocals, percussion, guitar
Bill Reynolds – bass, tambourine, guitar, percussion, sounds
Tyler Ramsey – guitar, vocals, percussion, keyboards, piano, theremin

References

External links
Music Video for Laredo on Youtube

2010 singles
Band of Horses songs
Music videos directed by Mark Pellington
2010 songs
Songs written by Ben Bridwell